Koen Kondo (Kôen Kondô; 近藤公園; born 11 October 1978) is a Japanese actor. He made his debut in the popular 2001 film Waterboys.

Selected filmography

Films
Waterboys (2001)
Parco Fiction (2002)
Ping Pong (2002)
Showa kayo daizenshu (2003)
Sayonara, Kuro (2003)
Zebraman (2004)
Love and Honor (2006)
Thirteen Assassins (2010)
About Her Brother (2010)
Samurai Hustle (2014)
Cape Nostalgia (2014)
Recall (2018)
Punk Samurai Slash Down (2018)
It's a Flickering Life (2021)

Television
Midnight Diner: Tokyo Stories (2016)
Idaten (2019), Rinsen Nakazawa

References

External links

1978 births
Living people
Japanese male actors
Actors from Aichi Prefecture